Corona Police Department (CPD) is the municipal police department of Corona, California. Corona PD was founded in 1914 and has evolved from a small-town force to a modern professional organization. Former Los Angeles Police Department administrators hired in the late 1970s and 1980s aided in CPD's adoption and use of "big city" policies and practices over the course of its development.

Currently employing 250 sworn officers and 75 professional civilian staff, Corona Police Department has three divisions: Field Services, Investigative Services, and Support Services.

History

Organization

Headquarters

Major Events

Controversies and Misconduct

References 

Municipal police departments of California
1914 establishments in California